Thomas Pieters (born 27 January 1992) is a Belgian professional golfer who currently plays on the European Tour.

Early life
Pieters was born in Geel, Belgium in 1992. He started playing golf at the age of five, learning the game at the Witbos Golf Club in Noorderwijk, Belgium.

Amateur career 
In 2010, he attended the University of Illinois for which he won the individual 2011 Jack Nicklaus Invitational and the individual 2012 NCAA Division I Championship in his second year; the next year, he finished second with his team at the 2013 NCAA Division I Championship and won the individual 2013 Big Ten Conference Championship.

Professional career 
In summer 2013, Pieters decided to forgo his senior year at the University of Illinois and turn professional. He made his debut on the European Tour in July at the Alstom Open de France, where he finished 29th; at the end of the year, he battled through all three stages of the European Tour Qualifying School taking the 20th card at the Final Stage, and qualified to play on the European Tour.

His best result in his first year was as runner-up in the 2014 Open de España, leading after the second and third rounds, finishing 6th at the Russian Open Golf Championship and 8th at the 2014 Malaysian Open and at the 2014 Alfred Dunhill Championship. He finished the year ranked #243 in the Official World Golf Ranking (OWGR), having ended the previous year at #1122.

In 2015, he started with a 4th-place finish at the Abu Dhabi HSBC Golf Championship which took him to #156 on the OWGR. In August and September, he won the D+D Real Czech Masters and the KLM Open in consecutive tournaments played and moved into the top 100 in the OWGR. The two wins and five top-10 placements of the season gave him a final 29th place in the Race to Dubai.

Pieters started 2016 at the Abu Dhabi HSBC Golf Championship, where he finished 2nd. In August, he represented Belgium at the 2016 Summer Olympics, finishing in 4th place. In the same month, he obtained a second place at the 2016 D+D Real Czech Masters and won the 2016 Made in Denmark. He was chosen by Darren Clarke as a captain's pick for the 2016 Ryder Cup.

Pieters' opened the 2017 season with a tie for 2nd at the Genesis Open in February and followed that up with a top-5 finish at the WGC-Mexico Championship. Those finishes moved Pieters to 29th in the Official World Golf Ranking and qualified him for his first Masters Tournament where his finished 4th. He capped a successful summer with his second top-5 finish at a WGC event when he finished 4th at the WGC-Bridgestone Invitational. That finish moved him into the top-25 of the OWGR. In September 2017, the European Tour announced that it would be returning to Belgium for the first time in 18 years with Pieters hosting the Belgian Knockout – a unique strokeplay and matchplay format – in May 2018.

In November 2018, Pieters won the 2018 World Cup of Golf with partner Thomas Detry, representing Belgium, at Metropolitan Golf Club in Melbourne, Australia.

In August 2019, Pieters shot a 3-under 69 to become the first golfer to win the D+D Real Czech Masters for the second time, beating Adri Arnaus by one stroke.

Pieters claimed his fifth European Tour victory in November 2021 at the Portugal Masters. Two months later, Pieters won the Abu Dhabi HSBC Championship for his sixth European Tour win and first Rolex Series victory.

In February 2023, it was confirmed that Pieters had joined LIV Golf.

Amateur wins
2009 International of Belgium Junior Championship
2011 Jack Nicklaus Invitational, Belgian Stroke Play Championship
2012 NCAA Division I Championship, Monroe Invitational
2013 Big Ten Championship

Professional wins (7)

European Tour wins (6)

European Tour playoff record (0–2)

Other wins (1)

Results in major championships
Results not in chronological order in 2020.

CUT = missed the half-way cut
"T" indicates a tie for a place
NT = No tournament due to COVID-19 pandemic

Summary

Most consecutive cuts made – 3 (three times, current)
Longest streak of top-10s – 1 (twice)

Results in The Players Championship

CUT = missed the halfway cut

Results in World Golf Championships

1Cancelled due to COVID-19 pandemic

QF, R16, R32, R64 = Round in which player lost in match play
"T" = tied
NT = No tournament
Note that the Championship and Invitational were discontinued from 2022.

Team appearances
Amateur
European Boys' Team Championship (representing Belgium): 2009, 2010 (winners)
Jacques Léglise Trophy (representing Continental Europe): 2010 (winners)
Eisenhower Trophy (representing Belgium): 2010, 2012
European Amateur Team Championship (representing Belgium):  2011
Palmer Cup (representing Europe): 2012 (winners)

Professional
Ryder Cup (representing Europe): 2016
World Cup (representing Belgium): 2016, 2018 (winners)
EurAsia Cup (representing Europe): 2018 (winners)
Hero Cup (representing Continental Europe): 2023 (winners)

See also
2013 European Tour Qualifying School graduates

References

External links
 
 
 
 
 
 
 

Belgian male golfers
PGA Tour golfers
European Tour golfers
LIV Golf players
Ryder Cup competitors for Europe
Olympic golfers of Belgium
Golfers at the 2016 Summer Olympics
Golfers at the 2020 Summer Olympics
Illinois Fighting Illini men's golfers
People from Geel
Sportspeople from Antwerp
1992 births
Living people